Strictly, digital theatre is a hybrid art form, gaining strength from theatre's ability to facilitate the imagination and create human connections and digital technology's ability to extend the reach of communication and visualization. (However, the phrase is also used in a more generic sense by companies such as Evans and Sutherland to refer to their fulldome projection technology products.)

Description 
Digital theatre is primarily identified by the coexistence of "live" performers and digital media in the same unbroken(1) space with a co-present audience. In addition to the necessity that its performance must be simultaneously "live" and digital, the event's secondary characteristics are that its content should retain some recognizable theatre roles (through limiting the level of interactivity) and a narrative element of spoken language or text. The four conditions of digital theatre are:

It is a "live" performance placing at least some performers in the same shared physical space with an audience.(2)
The performance must use digital technology as an essential part of the primary artistic event.(3)
The performance contains only limited levels of interactivity,(4) in that its content is shaped primarily by the artist(s) for an audience.(5)
The performance's content should contain either spoken language or text which might constitute a narrative or story, differentiating it from other events which are distinctly dance, art, or music.

"Live," digital media, interactivity, and narrative
A brief clarification of these terms in relation to digital theatre is in order. The significance of the terms "live" or "liveness" as they occur in theatre can not be over-emphasized, as it is set in opposition to digital in order to indicate the presence of both types of communication, human and computer-created. Rather than considering the real-time or temporality of events, digital theatre concerns the interactions of people (audience and actors) sharing the same physical space (in at least one location, if multiple audiences exist). In the case of mass broadcast, it is essential that this sharing of public space occurs at the site of the primary artistic event.(6) The next necessary condition for creating digital theatre is the presence of digital media in the performance. Digital media is not defined through the presence of one type of technology hardware or software configuration, but by its characteristics of being flexible, mutable, easily adapted, and able to be processed in real-time. It is the ability to change not only sound and light, but also images, video, animation, and other content into triggered, manipulated, and reconstituted data which is relayed or transmitted in relation to other impulses which defines the essential nature of the digital format.  Digital information has the quality of pure computational potential, which can be seen as parallel to the potential of human imagination.

The remaining characteristics of limited interactivity and narrative or spoken word are secondary and less distinct parameters.  While interactivity can apply to both the interaction between humans and machines and between humans, digital theatre is primarily concerned with the levels of interactivity occurring between audience and performers (as it is facilitated through technology).(7)  It is in this type of interactivity, similar to other types of heightened audience participation,(8) that the roles of message sender and receiver can dissolve to that of equal conversers, causing theatre to dissipate into conversation.  The term "interactive" refers to any mutually or reciprocally active communication, whether it be a human-human or a human-machine communication.

The criteria of having narrative content through spoken language or text as part of the theatrical event is meant not to limit the range of what is already considered standard theatre (as there are examples in the works of Samuel Beckett in which the limits of verbal expression are tested), but to differentiate between that which is digital theatre and the currently more developed fields of digital dance9 and Art Technology.(10)  This is necessary because of the mutability between art forms utilizing technology.  It is also meant to suggest a wide range of works including dance theatre involving technology and spoken words such as Troika Ranch's The Chemical Wedding of Christian Rosenkreutz (Troika Ranch, 2000), to the creation of original text-based works online by performers like the Plain Text Players or collaborations such as Art Grid's Interplay: Hallucinations, to pre-scripted works such as the classics (A Midsummer Night's Dream, The Tempest) staged with technology at the University of Kansas and the University of Georgia.

The Participatory Virtual Theatre efforts at the Rochester Institute of Technology take a different approach by have live actors use motion capture to control avatars on a virtual stage.  Audience responses are designed into the software that supports the performance.  In the 2004 production, "What's the Buzz?" (17), a single node motion capture device controlled the performance of a swarm of bees. Later performances use two motion capture systems located in different buildings controlling the performance on a single virtual stage (18).

These criteria or limiting parameters are flexible enough to allow for a wide range of theatrical activities while refining the scope of events to those which most resemble the hybrid "live"/mediated form of theatre described as digital theatre.  digital theatre is separated from the larger category of digital performance (as expressed in the overabundance of a variety of items including installations, dance concerts, Compact discs, robot fights and other events found in the Digital Performance Archive).

History
In the early 1980s, video, satellites, fax machines, and other communications equipment began to be used as methods of creating art and performance. The groups Fluxus and John Cage were among the early leaders in expanding what was considered art, technology, and performance.  With the adaptation of personal computers in the 1980s, new possibilities for creating performance communications was born.  Artists like Sherrie Rabinowitz and Kit Galloway began to transition from earlier, more costly experiments with satellite transmission to experiments with the developing internet.  Online communities such as The Well and interactive writing offered new models for artistic creativity.  With the 'Dot Com' boom of the 1990s, telematic artists including Roy Ascott began to develop greater significance as theatre groups like George Coates Performance Works and Gertrude Stein Repertory Theatre established partnerships with software and hardware companies encouraged by the technology boom. In Australia in the early 1990s Julie Martin's Virtual Reality Theatre presented works at the Sydney Opera House, featuring the first hybrid human digital avatars, in 1996 "A Midsummer Nights Dream featured Augmented Reality Stage sets designed and produced by her company.  Researchers such as Claudio Pinanhez at MIT, David Saltz of The Interactive Performance Laboratory at the University of Georgia, and Mark Reaney head of the Virtual Reality Theatre Lab at the University of Kansas, as well as significant dance technology partnerships (including Riverbed and Riverbed's work with Merce Cunningham) led to an unprecedented expansion in the use of digital technology in creating media-rich performances (including the use of motion capture, 3D stereoscopic animation, and virtual reality as in The Virtual Theatricality Lab's production of The Skriker at Henry Ford Community College under the direction of Dr. George Popovich. Another example is the sense:less project by Stenslie/Mork/Watz/Pendry using virtual actors that users would engage with inside a VR environment. The project was shown at ELECTRA, Henie Onstad Art Center, Norway,  DEAF 1996 in Rotterdam and the Fifth Istanbul Biennial (1997).

Early use of mechanical and projection devices for theatrical entertainments have a long history tracing back to mechanicals of ancient Greece and medieval magic lanterns.  But the most significant precursors of digital theatre can be seen in the works of the early 20th century.  It is in the ideas of artists including Edward Gordon Craig, Erwin Piscator (and to a limited degree Bertolt Brecht in their joint work on Epic Theatre), Josef Svoboda, and the Bauhaus and Futurists movements that we can see the strongest connections between today's use of digital media and live actors, and earlier, experimental theatrical use of non-human actors, broadcast technology, and filmic projections.

The presence of these theatrical progenitors using analog media, such as filmic projection, provides a bridge between Theatre and many of today's vast array of computer-art-performance-communication experiments.  These past examples of theatre artists integrating their modern technology with theatre strengthens the argument that theatrical entertainment does not have to be either purist involving only "live" actors on stage, or be consumed by the dominant televisual mass media, but can gain from the strengths of both types of communication.

Other terminology
Digital theatre does not exist in a vacuum but in relation to other terminology.  It is a type of Digital Performance and may accommodate many types of "live"/mediated theatre including "VR Theatre"(11) and "Computer Theatre,"(12) both of which involve specific types of computer media, "live" performers, story/words, and limited levels of interactivity.  However, terms such as "Desktop Theatre,"(13) using animated computer avatars in online chat-rooms without co-present audiences falls outside digital theatre into the larger category of digital performance.  Likewise, digital dance may fall outside the parameters of digital theatre, if it does not contain elements of story or spoken words.

"Cyberformance" can be included within this definition of Digital theatre, where it includes a proximal audience: "Cyberformance can be created and presented entirely online, for a distributed online audience who participate via internet-connected computers anywhere in the world, or it can be presented to a proximal audience (such as in a physical theatre or gallery venue) with some or all of the performers appearing via the internet; or it can be a hybrid of the two approaches, with both remote and proximal audiences and/or performers."

See also
 Digital performance
 History of theatre
 Stage terminology
 Theatre of Digital Art (ToDA), Duabi, UAE

Notes
Space not divided by visible solid interfaces such as walls, glass screens, or other visible barriers which perceptually divide the audience from the playing space making two (or more) rooms rather than a continuous place including both stage and audience.
It is suggested that a minimal audience of two or more is needed to keep a performance from being a conversation or art piece.  If additional online or mediated audiences exist, only one site need have a co-present audience/performer situation.
Digital technology may be used to create, manipulate or influence content. However, the use of technology for transmission or archiving does not constitute a performance of digital theatre.
Interactivity is more than choices on a navigation menu, low levels of participation or getting a desired response to a request.  Sheizaf Rafaeli defines it as existing in the relay of a message, in which the third or subsequent message refers back to the first.   "Formally stated, interactivity is an expression of the extent that in a given series of communication exchanges, any third (or later) transmission (or message) is related to the degree to which previous exchanges referred to even earlier transmissions" (Sheizaf Rafaeli, "Interactivity, From New Media to Communication," pages 110-34 in Advanced Communicational Science:  Merging Mass and Interpersonal Processes, ed. Robert P. Hawkins, John M. Wiemann, and Suzanne Pingree [Newbury Park:  Sage Publications, 1988] 111).
Though some of the content may be formed or manipulated by both groups, the flow of information is primarily from message creator or sender to receiver, thus maintaining the roles of author/performer and audience (rather than dissolving those roles into equal participants in a conversation). This also excludes gaming or VR environments in which the (usually isolated) participant is the director of the action which his actions drive.
While TV studio audiences may feel that they are at a public "live" performance, these performances are often edited and remixed for the benefit of their intended primary audience, the home audiences which are viewing the mass broadcast in private.  Broadcasts of "Great Performances" by PBS and other theatrical events broadcast into private homes, give the TV viewers the sense that they are secondary viewers of a primary "live" event.  In addition, archival or real-time web-casts which do not generate feedback influencing the "live" performances are not within the range of digital theatre.  In each case, a visible interface such as TV or monitor screen, like a camera frames and interprets the original event for the viewers.
An example of this is the case of internet chat which becomes the main text of be read or physically interpreted by performers on stage.  Online input including content and directions can also have an effect of influencing "live" performance beyond the ability of "live" co-present audiences.
E.g. happenings.
Such as the stunning visual media dance concerts like Ghostcatching, by Merce Cunningham and Riverbed, accessible online via the revamped/migrated Digital Performance Archive  and Merce Cunningham Dance; cf. Isabel C. Valverde, "Catching Ghosts in Ghostcatching:  Choreographing Gender and Race in Riverbed/Bill T. Jones' Virtual Dance," accessible in a pdf version from Extensions: The Online Journal of Embodied Teaching.
Such as Telematic Dreaming, by Paul Sermon, in which distant participants shared a bed through mixing projected video streams; see "Telematic Dreaming - Statement."
Mark Reaney, head of the Virtual Reality Theatre Lab at the University of Kansas, investigates the use of virtual reality ("and related technologies") in theatre.  "VR Theatre" is one form or subset of digital theatre focusing on utilizing virtual reality immersion in mutual concession with traditional theatre practices (actors, directors, plays, a theatre environment).  The group uses image projection and stereoscopic sets as their primary area of digital investigation.
Another example of digital theatre is Computer Theatre, as defined by Claudio S. Pinhanez in his work 'Computer Theatre (in which he also gives the definition of "hyper-actor" as an actor whose expressive capabilities are extended through the use of technologies).  "Computer Theatre, in my view, is about providing means to enhance the artistic possibilities and experiences of professional and amateur actors, or of audiences clearly engaged in a representational role in a performance"  (Computer Theater [Cambridge:  Perceptual Computing Group -- MIT Media Laboratory, 1996] (forthcoming in a revised ed.); Pinhanez also sees this technology being explored more through dance than theatre.  His writing and his productions of I/IT suggest that Computer Theatre is digital theatre.
On the far end of the spectrum, outside of the parameters of digital theatre, are what are called Desktop Theater and Virtual Theatre.  These are digital performances or media events which are created and presented on computers utilizing intelligent agents or synthetic characters, called avatars.  Often these are interactive computer programs or online conversations.  Without human actors, or group audiences, these works are computer multimedia interfaces allowing a user to play at the roles of theatre rather than being theatre.  Virtual Theatre is defined by the Virtual Theatre Project at Stanford on their website as a project which "aims to provide a multimedia environment in which user can play all of the creative roles associated with producing and performing plays and stories in an improvisational theatre company."
For more information, see Multimedia:  From Wagner to Virtual Reality, ed. Randall Packer and Ken Jordan; Telepresence and Bio Art, by Eduardo Kac; and Virtual Theatres:  An Introduction, by Gabriella Giannachi (London and New York: Routledge, 2004).
Media, in this sense, indicates the broadcast and projection of film, video, images and other content which can, but need not be digitized.  These elements are often seen as additions to traditional forms of theatre even before the use of computers to process them.  The addition of computers to process visual, aural and other data allows for greater flexibility in translating visual and other information into impulses which can interact with each other and their environments in real-time.  Media is also distinguished from mass media, by which primarily means TV broadcast, Film, and other communications resources owned by multi-national media corporations.  Mass media is that section of the media specifically conceived and designed to reach a very large audience (typically at least as large as the majority of the population of a nation state).  It refers primarily to television, film, internet, and various news/entertainment corporations and their subsidiaries.
Here the use of quotations signals a familiarity with the issues of mediation vs. real-time events as expressed by Phillip Auslander, yet choosing to use the term in its earlier meaning, indicating co-present human audience and actors in the same shared breathing space unrestrained by a physical barrier or perceived interface.  This earlier meaning is still in standard use by digital media performers to signify the simultaneous presence of the human and the technological other.  It is possible also to use the term (a)live to indicate co-presence.
Geigel, J.  and Schweppe, M., What's the Buzz?: A Theatrical Performance in Virtual Space, in Advancing Computing and Information Sciences, Reznik, L., ed., Cary Graphics Arts Press, Rochester, NY, 2005, pp. 109–116.
Schweppe, M. and Geigel, J., 2009.  "Teaching Graphics in the Context of Theatre", Eurographics 2009 Educators Program (Munich, Germany, March 30-April 1, 2009)

External links
 ''DigitalTheatre.Com Direct downloads website.''
 Digital Performance Archive hosted by AHDS Performing Arts
 Ontology vs. History:  Making Distinctions Between the Live and the Mediatized
 Merce Cunningham Dance
 Catching Ghosts in Ghostcatching
 "Telematic Dreaming"
 Troika Ranch
 Another Language Performance Art Company
 George Popovich
 eSpectacularKids - Online storytelling, magic shows and theatre for children

Theatre
Digital art
Performing arts